The Fortis I government of Italy held office from 28 March until 24 December 1905, a total of 271 days, or 8 months and 26 days.

Government parties
The government was composed by the following parties:

Composition

References

Italian governments
1905 establishments in Italy